Calathus mollis is a species of ground beetle from the Platyninae subfamily that can be found everywhere in Europe except for Albania, Andorra, Finland, Hungary, Italy, Luxembourg, Moldova, Monaco, Russia, San Marino, Slovakia, Switzerland, Vatican City, and various islands.

References

mollis
Beetles described in 1802
Beetles of Europe